Þorkell Sigurbjörnsson (or Thorkell Sigurbjörnsson) (born in Reykjavík on 16 July 1938 - died in Kópavogur on 30 January 2013) was an Icelandic composer, conductor and pianist.

Early life and study 

Born the son of bishop Sigurbjörn Einarsson and his wife, Magnea Þorkelsdóttur, he graduated from Reykjavík High School in 1957. He then moved to the United States to study at Hamline University in Minnesota, ultimately graduating in 1961 from the University of Illinois at Urbana–Champaign. He returned to Iceland in 1962, and hosted a regular radio show on RÚV for many years.

Career 

Þorkell taught piano, musicology, and music history at the Reykjavík College of Music for many years. He was also chair of the Icelandic Composers' Society from 1983 to 1987, sat for a time on the board of the Association of Icelandic Musicians and was president of the Association of Icelandic Artists from 1982 to 1986. He is best known for composing the music for the 13th century Icelandic hymn, Heyr himna smiður.

The most prolific Icelandic composer, he is author of more than 350 works, from songs for children to orchestral works.

Awards 

In 1993, Þorkell was awarded the Knight's Cross of the Icelandic Order of the Falcon for his contributions to the field of music. On May 16, 1995, he was named a member of the Royal Swedish Academy of Music.

References 

Knights of the Order of the Falcon
Icelandic musicians
Icelandic composers
1938 births
2013 deaths
Reykjavík College of Music people